Edward Richard Woods,  (born 20 September 1941, Greymouth) is a New Zealand diplomat and public servant. He is currently Chair of the Board of the Environmental Risk Management Authority, a New Zealand Government Agency that ensures compliance with the Hazardous Substances and New Organisms Act – HSNO Act 1996. He took over as chairman on the retirement of Neil Walter.

Woods was awarded the Companions of the New Zealand Order of Merit in 2007 for public services, lately as director of the New Zealand Security Intelligence Service, he was previously a diplomat with the Ministry of Foreign Affairs and Trade.

In 1961, Woods graduated with a BA from the University of Canterbury. This was followed by another BA (which was upgraded to an MA) from Brasenose College, Oxford in 1965.

Richard was married to Joanna Proby in 1970, they have two sons and five grandchildren.

Roles
 2008–		Chair, New Zealand Environmental Risk Management Authority (ERMA)
 2008–		New Zealand co-Chair, New Zealand/France Friendship Fund
 2008–		Trustee, Henry and William Williams Memorial Trust
 2007–		Trustee, Henry and William Williams Museum Trust
 1999–2006	Director and CEO, New Zealand Security Intelligence Service
 1995–99	Ambassador, Paris, and Permanent Representative to OECD
 1993–95	Ambassador, Moscow
 1991–93	Director, Development Cooperation, Ministry of Foreign Affairs and Trade (MFAT)
 1990–91	Director, Middle East and Africa, MFAT
 1988–90	Ambassador, Athens
 1984–87	Ambassador, Tehran
 1982–84	Deputy Head of Mission, Washington DC
 1980–81	Deputy Director, External Aid, Ministry of Foreign Affairs (MFA)
 1977–79	Consul-General, Bahrain
 1975–77	First Secretary, Tehran
 1973–74	First Secretary, MFA
 1968–72	Assistant Trade Commissioner, Rome
 1966–68	Advisory Officer, Department of Industries and Commerce

References

1941 births
Alumni of Brasenose College, Oxford
Ambassadors of New Zealand to Russia
Ambassadors of New Zealand to Ukraine
Ambassadors of New Zealand to Iran
Ambassadors of New Zealand to Greece
Ambassadors of New Zealand to France
Companions of the New Zealand Order of Merit
Living people
New Zealand public servants
University of Canterbury alumni
People from Greymouth
Ambassadors of New Zealand to the Organisation for Economic Co-operation and Development